Günther Würfel (born 24 March 1948) is an Austrian sprinter. He competed in the men's 4 × 100 metres relay at the 1972 Summer Olympics.

References

1948 births
Living people
Athletes (track and field) at the 1972 Summer Olympics
Austrian male sprinters
Olympic athletes of Austria
Place of birth missing (living people)